"Swanee" is an American popular song written in 1919 by George Gershwin, with lyrics by Irving Caesar. It is most often associated with singer Al Jolson.

The song was written for a New York City revue called Demi-Tasse, which opened in October 1919 at the Capitol Theater. Caesar, who was then aged 20, claimed to have written the song in about ten minutes riding on a bus in Manhattan, finishing it at Gershwin's apartment. It was written partly as a parody of Stephen Foster's "Old Folks at Home", including the title in its lyrics. It was originally used as a big production number, with 60 chorus girls dancing with electric lights in their slippers on an otherwise darkened stage.

Jolson versions
The song had little impact in its first show, but not long afterwards Gershwin played it at a party where Al Jolson heard it. Jolson then put it into his show Sinbad, already a success at the Winter Garden Theatre, and recorded it for Columbia Records in January 1920. "After that", said Gershwin, "Swanee penetrated the four corners of the earth." The song was charted in 1920 for 18 weeks, holding the No. 1 position for nine. It sold a million sheet music copies and an estimated two million records. It became Gershwin's first hit and the biggest-selling song of his career; the money he earned from it allowed him to concentrate on theatre work and films rather than writing further single pop hits. Arthur Schwartz said: "It's ironic that he never again wrote a number equaling the sales of Swanee, which for all its infectiousness, doesn't match the individuality and subtlety of his later works."

Jolson recorded the song several times in his career and performed it in the movies The Jolson Story (1946), Rhapsody in Blue (1945), and Jolson Sings Again (1949). For the song's performance in The Jolson Story, Jolson, rather than actor Larry Parks, appeared as himself, filmed in long shot. Although usually associated with Jolson, "Swanee" has been recorded by many other singers, most notably Judy Garland in A Star Is Born.

The song was also used by the Sydney Swans Australian Rules Football Club for its marketing promotions in the late 1990s.

The University of Florida's marching band, The Pride of the Sunshine, plays "Swanee" at Florida Gators football games.

Recorded versions
 Al Jolson – recorded on January 8, 1920, released as Columbia A 2884, matrix 78917-2
 Judy Garland – 1939, in 1954 for A Star is Born, and for her 1961 live concert album Judy at Carnegie Hall
 Al Jolson – 1943, included in the movie Rhapsody in Blue (1945)
 Al Jolson – recorded on August 10, 1945, released as Decca 23470, matrix L 3912
 Bing Crosby recorded the song on August 25, 1955, for The Bing Crosby Show, and it was used by Decca Records on Crosby's album Some Fine Old Chestnuts 12" LP version. It is featured on his album Bing on Broadway and the Mosaic 7-CD collection The Bing Crosby CBS Radio Recordings 1954-56. He also recorded another version in 1975 for inclusion on his album A Southern Memoir.
 Jaye P. Morgan – 1955 chart single
 Connie Francis – 1960, Songs To A Swinging Band album (MGM Records MGM E3893 USA)
 The Temptations – 1968, released on Live at the Copa album
 The Muppets – rec. 1979, broadcast as part of Episode 402 of The Muppet Show (refrain only, reinterpreted as a German Oom-pah song)
 James Gelfand – 2004, included in the movie Jack Paradise (Les nuits de Montréal)
 Paul Simon – 1960, recording under his early pseudonym, Jerry Landis.

See also
 Suwannee River of southern Georgia and northern Florida.

References

External links 
 

1919 songs
Songs with music by George Gershwin
Songs with lyrics by Irving Caesar
Al Jolson songs
Judy Garland songs
United States National Recording Registry recordings
Songs about rivers